Tim Sørensen (born 14 May 2000) is a speedway rider from Denmark.

Speedway career 
Sørensen came to prominence during the 2020 season when he was part of the Danish team that won the silver medal at the 2020 Team Speedway Junior World Championship. The following year he was once again selected by Denmark for the event and won the silver medal again at the 2021 Team Speedway Junior World Championship. He was also the Danish Under 21 Individual Speedway Championship winner in 2021.

In 2022, he made his debut for a Polish side representing Ostrów, he had previously signed for Orzeł Łódź in 2020 but the COVID-19 pandemic meant that he could not ride. Also in 2022, he rode for Masarna in the Elitserien and won the 2022 Norwegian Individual Speedway Championship.

References 

2000 births
Living people
Danish speedway riders